Coolmine Community School is a co-educational secondary school in the Coolmine suburb of Dublin.  It lies within Greater Blanchardstown in the administration of Fingal.

History
The school was one of the two first community schools founded in Ireland, in 1972, and was officially blessed and opened in 1974. It was established by the State after considerable discussion between a local parents' committee, the Department of Education, the Vocational Education Committee and the Roman Catholic Archdiocese of Dublin, with a view to integrating the traditional academic approach of the secondary schools with the tradition of the vocational schools.

Operations
The school caters for over 1,200 pupils, both boys and girls, aged from 12 to 19 years, who live mainly within a geographically defined catchment area. The premises includes a sports and leisure complex with an indoor heated swimming pool.

The school crest embodies a stylised version of Crois Bhríde, or St Brigid's Cross, with the early Irish symbol of the Holy Trinity surrounded by the "C" of community and underlined by the motto "Creideamh Beo", living faith.

Notable past pupils
 Joanne Cantwell, sports broadcaster
 Philip Cassidy, former professional cyclist
 Martin Earley, former professional cyclist
 Jade Jordan, actor and author
 Mark Kennedy, former Ireland international footballer

References

External links
 Coolmine Community School

Secondary schools in Fingal
Community schools in the Republic of Ireland